First Milestone is a rock marked by breakers,  northwest of Cape Saunders, off the north coast of South Georgia. It was charted and named by Discovery Investigations personnel on the Discovery during the period 1926–30.

References 

Rock formations of Antarctica